Stephen Christopher Dodd (born 15 July 1966) is a Welsh professional golfer who after a moderate career, unexpectedly won two events on the European Tour in the 2005 season at the age of 38 and won a third time in 2006. He also won the 2005 WGC-World Cup in partnership with Bradley Dredge. Since turning 50 he has won four times on the European Senior Tour, including the 2021 Senior Open Championship.

Personal life
Dodd was born in Cardiff. He resides in Barry, Wales with his wife Allison and their son Liam.

Amateur career
Dodd had a successful amateur career highlighted by victory in The Amateur Championship at Royal Birkdale in 1989, which qualified him to play in The Open Championship that year and the Masters Tournament the following year. He played in the 1989 Walker Cup, being part of the first Great Britain and Ireland team to win in the United States. He was named BBC Wales Sports Personality of the Year in 1989.

Professional career
Dodd turned professional in 1990. He spent the early years of his professional career on Europe's second tier Challenge Tour. In 1992 he won the Bank Austria Open on that tour, but his results were generally patchy. He first gained his place on the main European Tour in 1995, but found himself returning to qualifying school every year until 2001, when he finally broke into the top 100 on the Order of Merit to automatically retain his playing status. He then steadily improved, having new personal best seasons in 2003 and 2004, finishing 80th and 58th respectively on the money list.

The 2005 season marked a sudden improvement in Dodd's fortunes. He won the first tournament he entered that season, the Volvo China Open (actually played in late 2004), which was one of several events co-sanctioned by the European Tour and the Asian Tour. A few weeks later he picked up a new biggest paycheck of his career by coming tied second in the higher profile Dubai Desert Classic. He went on to win the Nissan Irish Open in May, and in November he won the WGC-World Cup for Wales in partnership with Bradley Dredge. He finished the season ranked a career high 17th on the Order of Merit.

In 2006 Dodd won the Smurfit European Open, granting him a five-year exemption on the European Tour. He finished the season ranked 29th on the Order of Merit. Since then his form has dropped, and in 2008 he made just 4 cuts as he slipped to 245th on the end of season money list. His career started to decline and by 2012, he was playing on the third-tier Dubai-based MENA Golf Tour, where he had three wins. In 2016 he won the GRENKE Championship on the PGA EuroPro Tour, a few weeks before his 50th birthday.

Dodd joined the European Senior Tour after turning 50. In his first season, 2016, he won the Senior Italian Open and followed up with wins in the 2017 Farmfoods European Senior Masters and the 2018 WINSTONgolf Senior Open.

Dodd's biggest success of his career came at the 2021 Senior Open Championship. He shot an 8-under-par 62 in the third round to take a two shot lead going into the final round. A 68 on the final day was good enough to see off Miguel Ángel Jiménez by one shot. The win also gave him an exemption into the 2022 Open Championship.

Amateur wins
1989 The Amateur Championship, Welsh Amateur Championship, Welsh Amateur Open Stroke Play Championship

Professional wins (19)

European Tour wins (3)

1Co-sanctioned by the Asian Tour

European Tour playoff record (1–0)

Challenge Tour wins (1)

PGA EuroPro Tour wins (1)

MENA Tour wins (3)

Other wins (7)
1991 Memorial Olivier Barras
1995 Welsh PGA Championship
2001 Welsh PGA Championship
2005 WGC-World Cup (with Bradley Dredge)
2007 Ryder Cup Wales Welsh PGA Championship
2011 Welsh National PGA Championship
2014 Welsh National PGA Championship

PGA Tour Champions wins (1)

European Senior Tour wins (4)

Results in major championships
Results not in chronological order in 2020.

CUT = missed the half-way cut
NT = No tournament due to the COVID-19 pandemic
Note: Dodd never played in the U.S. Open.

Results in World Golf Championships

"T" = Tied

Senior major championships

Wins (1)

Results timeline
Results not in chronological order before 2022.

CUT = missed the halfway cut
"T" indicates a tie for a place
NT = No tournament due to COVID-19 pandemic

Team appearances
Amateur
Walker Cup (representing Great Britain & Ireland): 1989 (winners)
European Amateur Team Championship (representing Wales): 1987, 1989

Professional
Seve Trophy (representing Great Britain & Ireland): 2005 (winners)
World Cup (representing Wales): 2005 (winners), 2006, 2007, 2009

References

External links

Welsh male golfers
European Tour golfers
European Senior Tour golfers
Winners of senior major golf championships
Sportspeople from Cardiff
1966 births
Living people